Presidential elections will be held in Poland in 2025. They can be held earlier, should the office become vacated as a result of death, resignation or removal from office of the incumbent. Due to constitutional term limits, incumbent president Andrzej Duda is ineligible for re-election.

Electoral system 
The president is elected using the two-round system; if no candidate receives a majority of the vote in the first round, a run-off is held between the top two candidates. Presidents serve a five year term and can be re-elected once. The term of Andrzej Duda expires on 6 August 2025, and the president-elect will take oath of office on that day, before the National Assembly (a joint session of Sejm and Senate).

Candidate selection

Potential candidates

Law and Justice 
Mateusz Morawiecki, Prime Minister, (2017–present), Deputy Prime Minister, (2015–2017), Minister of Finance, (2016–2018)
Beata Szydło, MEP for Lesser Poland and Świętokrzyskie (2019–present), former Prime Minister (2015–2017)
Elżbieta Witek, Marshal of the Sejm, (2019–present)
Agata Kornhauser-Duda, First Lady, (2015–present)
Zbigniew Ziobro, Minister of Justice (2005-2007,2015–present), leader of Solidary Poland
Marek Magierowski, Poland Ambassador to the United States (2021–present)
Kacper Płażyński, Member of the Sejm (2019–present)

Civic Platform 

Rafał Trzaskowski, Mayor of Warsaw (2018–present), Civic Platform candidate for president in 2020.

Donald Tusk, Chairman of the Civic Platform (2003–2014, 2021–present), Prime Minister of Poland (2007–2014), President of the European Council (2014–2019), President of the European People's Party (2019–2022) 
Bogdan Zdrojewski, Member of the Senate (1997–2000, 2019–present)

Poland 2050 

 Szymon Hołownia, journalist and writer, founder of Poland 2050 and candidate for president in 2020.

The Left 

 Agnieszka Dziemianowicz-Bąk, Member of the Sejm (2019–present)
 Włodzimierz Czarzasty, Deputy Marshal of the Sejm (2019–present), Member of the Sejm (2019–present), Co-Leader of New Left (Poland) (2021–present)

 Robert Biedroń, LGBT activist, Member of the European Parliament (2019–present), Co-Leader of New Left (Poland) (2021–present), Member of the Sejm (2011–2014) and candidate for president in 2020

 Joanna Scheuring-Wielgus, Member of the Sejm (2015–present)
 Katarzyna Kotula, Member of the Sejm (2019–present)

Polish People's Party 

 Władysław Kosiniak-Kamysz, Leader of the Polish People's Party (2015–present), Minister of Labour and Social Policy (2011-2015) and candidate for president in 2020

Confederation Liberty and Independence 

 Krzysztof Bosak, Member of the Sejm (2005–2007, 2019–present) and candidate for president in 2020
 Grzegorz Braun Member of the Sejm (2019-present), candidate for the Early Rzeszów Presidential Election, and candidate for the 2019–20 Confederation presidential primary

The Greens 

 Sylwia Spurek, Member of the European Parliament (2019–present)

Declined to be candidates

Civic Platform 

Małgorzata Kidawa-Błońska, Vice-Chair of the Civic Platform (2021–present), Deputy Marshal of the Sejm (2015–present), Marshal of the Sejm (2015)

References

2020s elections in Poland
Presidential elections in Poland
Poland
Presidential